King of Wands or Batons is a card used in Latin suited playing cards which include Italian, Spanish and tarot decks.  It is part of what tarot card readers call the "Minor Arcana" Tarot cards are used throughout much of Europe to play tarot card games. In English-speaking countries, where the games are largely unknown, Tarot cards came to be utilized primarily for divinatory purposes.

Key meanings
The key meanings of the King of Wands:
Authority figure
Financial gain
Honest and trustworthy
Mediation
Professional

References

 

Suit of Wands
Fictional kings